Attila Simon (born 1 June 1970 in Budapest) is a Hungarian sport shooter. He has competed for Hungary in pistol shooting at the 2004 Summer Olympics, and has attained a top seven finish in a major international competition, spanning the 2003 European Championships. Simon also trains under head coach Mihály Tesánszky for ten years as a member of the Hungarian shooting team at Budapest Honvéd SE.

Simon qualified for the Hungarian squad in pistol shooting at the 2004 Summer Olympics in Athens. He managed to get a minimum qualifying score of 555 to gain an Olympic quota place for Hungary in the free pistol, following his outstanding seventh-place finish at the European Championships in Plzen, Czech Republic one year earlier. Simon got off to a shaky start on the first day of the Games by placing further down at a distant forty-third in the 10 m air pistol with a total of 562, just seven points better than his entry standard. Three days later, in the 50 m pistol, Simon continued his unsteady Olympic feat with a qualifying score of 536 to end up in thirty-sixth out of forty-two shooters, failing to advance to the final.

References

External links

1970 births
Living people
Hungarian male sport shooters
Olympic shooters of Hungary
Shooters at the 2004 Summer Olympics
Sport shooters from Budapest
21st-century Hungarian people